Windows Cyrillic + French is a modification of Windows-1251 that was used by Paratype to cover languages that use the Cyrillic script such as Russian and Bulgarian on a French language keyboard. This encoding was also used by Gamma Productions (now Unitype). This encoding is supported by FontLab Studio 5.

Character set
The following table shows Windows Cyrillic + French. Each character is shown with its Unicode equivalent and its decimal code.

References 

Windows code pages